Miloš Krkotić (born 29 September 1987) is a Montenegrin international footballer who plays for Serbian club Zlatibor Čajetina.

Club career
Krkotić started playing with FK Zeta and was promoted to the senior squad in the 2006–07 season, precisely when Zeta won their first ever championship.

In Summer 2011, Moldovan champions FC Dacia Chișinău, coached by Igor Dobrovolski, brought Miloš Krkotić along his compatriot Janko Tumbasević as summer reinforcements. Krkotić performed regularly until 2015. He won the 2011 Moldovan Super Cup as soon as he came but unfortunately Dacia missed to win the championship while Krkotić was there and finished as second in the league 4 out of 5 seasons he spent there. In the 2013–14 season, Krkotić scored 14 goals in the league, a feature that earned him attention from Montenegrin FA and a call to the national team.

After five seasons in Moldova, Krkotić returned to Zeta in summer 2016 and his solid performance by scoring 4 goals in 15 appearances during the first half of the 2016–17 Montenegrin First League earned him attention from several clubs, including Serbian giant FK Partizan Belgrade.

At winter-break, Krkotić moved abroad again, this time by signing with Serbian top-league club FK Metalac Gornji Milanovac. He had a brief spell in 2017 with FK Mladost before finally joining Albanian champions FK Kukësi in the Albanian Superliga.

On 18 March 2018, he signed a one-year contract with Indonesian club Bali United. But he was released on 5 July 2018.

International career
Krkotić made his debut for the Montenegro national team on 26 March 2013 in a 1–1 draw against England in FIFA World Cup 2014 qualifying and has earned a total of 5 caps, scoring no goals. His final international was a November 2013 friendly match against Luxembourg.

Honours
Zeta
 Montenegrin First League: 2006–07

Dacia Chișinău
 Moldovan Super Cup: 2011

References

External links

1987 births
Living people
People from Podgorica Municipality
Association football midfielders
Montenegrin footballers
Montenegro international footballers
FK Zeta players
FC Dacia Chișinău players
FK Metalac Gornji Milanovac players
OFK Titograd players
FK Kukësi players
Bali United F.C. players
FK Budućnost Podgorica players
KF Feronikeli players
FK Zlatibor Čajetina players
Montenegrin First League players
Moldovan Super Liga players
Serbian SuperLiga players
Kategoria Superiore players
Liga 1 (Indonesia) players
Football Superleague of Kosovo players
Serbian First League players
Montenegrin expatriate footballers
Expatriate footballers in Moldova
Montenegrin expatriate sportspeople in Moldova
Expatriate footballers in Serbia
Montenegrin expatriate sportspeople in Serbia
Expatriate footballers in Albania
Montenegrin expatriate sportspeople in Albania
Expatriate footballers in Indonesia
Montenegrin expatriate sportspeople in Indonesia
Expatriate footballers in Kosovo
Montenegrin expatriate sportspeople in Kosovo